James Elden Waugh (November 25, 1933 – February 16, 2010) was an American professional baseball pitcher.

Waugh graduated from Lancaster High School and attended Ohio University and Ohio State University. Signed by the Pirates in 1951, he made his MLB debut in April 1952 at the age of 18 after only one minor-league season. On August 9, he won his first big-league game with a complete game, 4–3 victory over the Chicago Cubs at Forbes Field. Wins were hard to come by for both Waugh and his team; he lost the other six decisions of his rookie campaign, and the 1952 Pirates dropped 112 of their 154 games. In 1953, Waugh worked in 29 games with 11 starts and posted his second career complete-game, a 5–2 triumph over the Philadelphia Phillies at Connie Mack Stadium on August 20. His sophomore season saw him improve his won–lost record to 4–5, but his earned run average was a poor 6.48. The 1953 Pirates won only 50 games themselves.

Waugh's last MLB game came on September 26, 1953; he started against the New York Giants and was tagged with a 5–3 loss. In his 46 major-league games, including 18 starts, he won five games and lost 11, with an ERA of 6.43. In 142 innings pitched, he allowed 169 hits and 88 bases on balls, recording 41 strikeouts.

Waugh's last pro season was 1956. He died in Rock Hill, South Carolina, in February 2010.

References

External links

1933 births
2010 deaths
Baseball players from Ohio
Brunswick Pirates players
Burlington-Graham Pirates players
Charleston Rebels players
Hutchinson Elks players
Kinston Eagles players
Lincoln Chiefs players
Major League Baseball pitchers
New Orleans Pelicans (baseball) players
People from Lancaster, Ohio
Pittsburgh Pirates players
Williamsport Grays players